Megachile pyrrhothorax is a species of bee in the family Megachilidae. It was described by Schletterer in 1891.

References

Pyrrhothorax
Insects described in 1891